Álex Jiménez is the name of:

Álex Jiménez (footballer, born 2002), Dominican Republic footballer
Álex Jiménez (footballer, born 2005), Spanish footballer